Carl Gouveia (born 17 April 1926) was a Guyanese cricketer. He played in one first-class match for British Guiana in 1946/47.

See also
 List of Guyanese representative cricketers

References

External links
 

1926 births
Possibly living people
Guyanese cricketers
Guyana cricketers
Sportspeople from Georgetown, Guyana